Heidi Macaraan Lloce-Mendoza (born November 3, 1962) is a former Undersecretary General for the United Nations Office of Internal Oversight.  A Filipino public official, Mendoza was commissioner and officer-in-charge of the Commission on Audit of the Philippines from 2011 to 2015. On October 6, 2015, Mendoza was nominated by UN Secretary-General Ban Ki-moon to head the United Nations Office of Internal Oversight Services replacing Canadian Carman Lapointe. Mendoza has also served as an external auditor for the Food and Agriculture Organization, World Health Organization and International Labour Organization.

Early life and education  
Mendoza was born in Tayabas, Quezon to Agapito Lloce, a policeman and Silveria Macaraan. She attended Tayabas East Elementary School, and finished high school as class valedictorian at the St. John Bosco Academy in Tayabas. Mendoza graduated with an Accountancy degree from Sacred Heart College of Lucena City in 1983, and became a certified public accountant in 1984. She also took up post-graduate studies from the National College of Public Administration and Governance at the University of the Philippines Diliman and National Defense College of the Philippines, taking up Public Administration and National Security Administration, respectively.

She is married to Meynardo Mendoza and has three children.

References  

United Nations Secretariat
Filipino officials of the United Nations
University of the Philippines Diliman alumni
Under-Secretaries-General of the United Nations
Commissioners of constitutional commissions of the Philippines
Filipino civil servants
People from Tayabas
1962 births
Living people
Benigno Aquino III administration personnel